Tiffany is a surname of English origin.

Persons
 Members of the Tiffany family of jewelers:
 Charles Lewis Tiffany (1812–1902), founder of Tiffany & Co.
 Charles Comfort Tiffany (1829–1907), American Episcopal clergyman, a Tiffany cousin
 Dorothy Burlingham-Tiffany (1891–1979), psychoanalyst, daughter of Louis Comfort Tiffany
 Joseph Burr Tiffany, designer, nephew of Charles Lewis Tiffany
 Louis Comfort Tiffany (1848–1933), stained glass artist and jewelry designer, son of Charles Lewis Tiffany
 Carrie Tiffany (born 1965), Australian novelist
 George Sylvester Tiffany (1805–1856), Canadian lawyer
 John Kerr Tiffany (1842–1897), of St. Louis, Missouri
 Lois H. Tiffany (1924–2009), American mycologist
 Robert Tiffany (1942–1993), British nurse
 Stanley Tiffany (1908–1971), English Labour Party politician, Member of Parliament (MP) for Peterborough (1945–1950)
 Tom Tiffany (born 1957), member of the U.S. House of Representatives from Wisconsin (2020–)

See also
 Tiffany (given name)
 Tiphaine (disambiguation)

English-language surnames